Souf may refer to:

Souf, a town in Jerash Governorate, Jordan
Souf Camp, a Palestinian refugee camp situated near the town of Souf, Jordan 
Souf (singer), real name Soufiene Nouhi, Moroccan-French singer 
Souf, a north eastern Algerian city near the Tunisian borders.

See also
Sufi (disambiguation)